The 2003 Women's FA Community Shield was the fourth Women's FA Community Shield, as with its male equivalent, the Community Shield is an annual football match played between the winners of the previous season's league and the previous season's Women's FA Cup. The match was contested between Fulham and Doncaster Belles, Fulham won 1-0.

References

Women's FA Community Shield
Community Shield
Community Shield
Community Shield